University College Dublin Students' Union (UCDSU) is the students' union of University College Dublin. It is the largest students' union in Ireland.

The Union was founded in 1975 as the successor of the Student Representative Council, with Enda Connolly acting as the organisation's first president. Its primary role is to represent its members views and defend their interests.

The students union is made up of 6 full time elected staff along with college officers, campaign coordinators and class representatives.

All students of UCD who are studying for a degree or postgraduate diploma of the National University of Ireland are, on registration at the university, members. In addition to its campaign work the Union also provides many services, such as three shops; welfare and education services such as an online second-hand bookshop; and the provision of a full-time accommodation officer.

History
The Union has been at the forefront of pushing social change in Ireland, selling condoms starting in 1979, when the sale of contraceptives without a prescription was still illegal. The Director of Public Prosecutions considered legal action against the Union but ultimately demurred, believing the Union was deliberately attempting to provoke a case and that the "clearly unconstitutional" 1935 law prohibiting their sale had "little or no chance of being upheld". The sale of contraceptives without a prescription was finally legalised in 1985, and their general sale legalised in 1993.

The Union was also at the forefront of the fight for the right to publish information about abortion. In 1988, the Society for the Protection of Unborn Children (Spuc) threatened the Union with legal action if information on abortion was published in its welfare guide. The Union went ahead and published information on abortion clinics in Britain and a case was taken against it, Spuc v. Coogan, that was later joined by the Trinity College Student Union and Union of Students in Ireland in Spuc v. Grogan. The case was initially dismissed in the High Court on the basis that Spuc lacked standing but Spuc ultimately prevailed in the Supreme Court leaving the unions involved with large legal fees. The case ultimately as far as the European Court of Justice, which established that under the Treaty of Rome abortion was a service and a Member State could not prohibit the distribution of information about a service legally provided in another Member State. While establishing the principle that Ireland could not block the publication of abortion information from foreign clinics or their agents, the Court found it was legal for Ireland the block information from third parties, so establishing a principle of freedom of abortion information but ultimately finding against the students due to their status as unconnected third parties and leaving them with their costs. The provision of information on abortion services legally available in other European Union countries was ultimately legalised in the 1995 Abortion Information Act.

In later years the Union had financial problems. A 2012 audit found shoddy financial practices devoid of checks and balances since 2007, racking up €1.4m in debt including nearly €400,000 in liability to the tax authorities, ultimately requiring a bailout from the University. Following this, the Union incorporated as a limited liability company in 2012 and recorded a steady income with a surplus in subsequent years.

The Union has had a rocky relationship with the Union of Students in Ireland (USI), disaffiliating and reaffiliating several times over the years. As of 2021, UCDSU is not affiliated with USI, having decided to leave in a referendum which was held in February 2013, 67% of students voted to leave the national union, reaffirming this in a 2016 with 74% of Students voting for UCDSU to remain outside of USI. Issues for un-affiliating and continuing to remain outside of USI cited included the ineffectual leadership of USI, transparency in USI operations and the large cost of affiliation which would amount to over €100,000.  UCDSU ceased being a member organisation on 1 July 2013.

Structure
The main governing body of UCDSU, subject only to referendums and general meetings of the members of the Union, is the Union Council, which meets every second week of term. The Union Council is composed chiefly of class representatives elected in their respective constituencies. These constituencies are elected at a flexible ratio, far lower than a previously arbitrary ratio of one representative per 125 students. The power of Union Council is conferred in a de facto manner on the Union Executive outside of term. The Union Executive, composed of elected sabbatical and non-sabbatical officers as well as the Union secretary, meets weekly during term and fortnightly outside of it. There are several sabbatical officers, who are involved in the day-to-day running of the Union. The president and two nominated vice-presidents, as agreed by the executive, are student representatives on the UCD Governing Authority. A sabbatical term of office is twelve months in duration and commences on 1 July each year, although the incoming officers are, in accordance with the UCDSU constitution, given job training by the incumbents from 15 June. Sabbatical elections take place in late February–early March of each year. Sabbatical officers take a year out from academic studies and work full-time for the Union.

The composition of the Union's Council includes a number of full-time elected sabbatical executive officers, elected non-sabbatical executive officers, class representatives, campaign coordinators and an entertainments forum.

References

External links
University College Dublin Students' Union — the official website of UCDSU.
Union of Students in Ireland — the website of the Union of Students in Ireland
University College Dublin Students' Union Constitution — The most recently amended form of the Union's Constitution.

Students' unions in Ireland
University College Dublin